Spooney Melodies was a series of live action musical shorts produced for Warner Bros. aimed to showcase popular tunes of the day.  Only the first entry in the series bore the title "Spooney Melodies."  Subsequent releases, of which there were four, bore the series title "Song'nata."

As noted above, only five were made in 1930 and 1931. According to The Vitaphone Project, which tracks the status of early Warner Bros. sound films, all five films survive; the four "Song'nata" entries were not produced in the sound-on-disk Vitaphone format, but all survive in 35mm form. The first short, which is the one most widely available, is approximately six minutes long and features art deco style animations combined with film of the live-action performer (in this case, organist Milton Charles). The music for the first short was arranged by Frank Marsales, who was also the composer of the music for the earliest Looney Tunes, produced at approximately the same time as "Cryin' for the Carolines."  For its time those shorts are considered to be innovative and could be considered to be one of the earliest music videos. Production on this series ceased in 1931, and it was replaced with an animation-only series called Merrie Melodies in 1931, also produced by Leon Schlesinger.

Spooney Melodies/Song'nata — 5 titles

References

American film series
Film series introduced in 1930